(Swedish for 20 best songs) is a 1997 compilation album from Swedish group Chips. 20 bästa låtar was released 14 years after Chips was disestablished in 1983.

Track listing
Dag efter dag – Elisabeth & Kikki
Starry Night – Kikki & Lasse
Sensation – Lasse
Having a Party – Elisabeth & Kikki
In Arabia – Lasse
Jealousy – Elisabeth
Tokyo – Instrumental
So long Sally – Lasse
Don't Cry No More – Lasse
Someone Needs Somebodys Love – Kikki
Weekend – Kikki
Our Love is Over – Kikki
Paris – Lasse
Can't get over you – Kikki
Good Morning – Elisabeth, Kikki, Tanja & Lasse
I Remember High School – Tanja
A Little Bit of Loving – Kikki, Tanja & Lasse (Mycke' mycke' mer)
Get Him Out of Your Mind – Elisabeth
Nobodys Baby but Mine – Kikki
It Takes More than a Minute – Tanja

References

1997 compilation albums
Chips (band) compilation albums
Swedish-language compilation albums